Todd Santos (born February 12, 1964) is a former American football quarterback in the National Football League (NFL). He was drafted by the New Orleans Saints in the 10th round of the 1988 NFL Draft. He played college football at San Diego State.

Santos also played for the San Francisco 49ers.

See also
 List of NCAA major college football yearly passing leaders
 List of NCAA major college football yearly total offense leaders

References

External links
 San Diego State Aztecs bio

1964 births
Living people
American football quarterbacks
San Diego State Aztecs football players
San Francisco 49ers players
People from Fresno, California